Filip Holender (born 27 July 1994) is a Hungarian professional footballer who plays as a forward for Vasas.

Club career

Budapest Honvéd
During his career at Budapest Honvéd Holender scored 30 goals in 159 matches.

Lugano
On 21 July 2019, Holender played his first match in Lugano against FC Zürich in 4-0 away victory for Lugano in the 2019–20 Swiss Super League. On 25 August 2019 he scored two goals against FC Saint Gallen on the 5th match day, although Lugano lost 3–2 at the Kybunpark, St. Gallen.

Partizan
By early October, Holender agreed to a loan deal to Serbian side FK Partizan.

International career
Holender was born in Kragujevac, FR Yugoslavia (today in Serbia) and his grandfather was Hungarian He decided to represent Hungary internationally, and debuted for the Hungary national under 21 team at 8 September 2014.

He made his debut for the senior national team on 18 November 2018 in a 2018–19 UEFA Nations League C game against Finland.

On 5 September 2019, he scored his first goal in a friendly match against Montenegro at the Podgorica City Stadium, Podgorica, Montenegro.

On 1 June 2021, Holender was included in the final 26-man squad to represent Hungary at the rescheduled UEFA Euro 2020 tournament.

Career statistics

Club

International goals

Scores and results list Hungary's goal tally first, score column indicates score after each Holender goal.

References

External links

 HLSZ
 

1994 births
Living people
Sportspeople from Kragujevac
Hungarian footballers
Hungary under-21 international footballers
Hungary international footballers
Serbian footballers
Hungarian people of Serbian descent
Serbian people of Hungarian descent
Association football wingers
Association football forwards
Budapest Honvéd FC players
Nemzeti Bajnokság I players
FC Lugano players
Swiss Super League players
UEFA Euro 2020 players
Hungarian expatriate footballers
Hungarian expatriate sportspeople in Switzerland
Expatriate footballers in Switzerland
Serbs of Hungary